Truskolasy  is a village in the administrative district of Gmina Wręczyca Wielka, within Kłobuck County, Silesian Voivodeship, in southern Poland. Between 1975 and 1998 Truskolasy belonged to Częstochowa Voivodeship.

The village has a population of 2,044 in 2008. It has a wooden Baroque church.

Notable residents 
The Polish footballer Jakub Błaszczykowski and former head coach of the Poland national football team Jerzy Brzęczek were born in Truskolasy.

References

Truskolasy